Dagmar Huťková (born 20 December 1971 in Banská Bystrica) is a Slovak former basketball player who competed in the 2000 Summer Olympics.

References

1971 births
Living people
Slovak women's basketball players
Czechoslovak women's basketball players
Olympic basketball players of Slovakia
Basketball players at the 2000 Summer Olympics
Sportspeople from Banská Bystrica